is a JR West Kabe Line station located in Midorii, Asaminami-ku, Hiroshima, Hiroshima Prefecture, Japan. It is the largest station within Asaminami-ku.

Station layout
Midorii Station features one island platform handling two tracks. The station building is located south-west of the platform, and a railway crossing connects the platform and station building. The station features a ticket office. A large parking lot and bus stop is situated outside the station. Despite being the largest station in Asaminami-ku, Midorii Station is very simple in design and size when compared to Ōmachi Station and Shimo-Gion Station.

Platforms

History

1910-12-18: Midorii Station opens
1987-04-01: Japanese National Railways is privatized, and Midorii Station becomes a JR West station
1994-08-20: Station is upgraded from a single track side platform to a double track island platform

Surrounding area
Sanyō Expressway Interchange
 Japan National Route 54
Tenmaya department store
Hiroshima Hiroshima Shimo-Midorii Post Office (no ATM)
Hiroshima Municipal Kawauchi Elementary School
Hiroshima Municipal Midorii Elementary School
Hiroshima Asa Junior High School
FujiGrand Midorii
Midorii Tenmaya
Hiroshima Bank
Momiji Bank
Hiroshima Credit Union
ATMs: Asaminami Post Office, Hiroshima Bank, Momiji Bank
JR West Geibi Line Akiyaguchi Station is located about 1.5 km east of Midorii Station

External links

 JR West

Kabe Line
Hiroshima City Network
Stations of West Japan Railway Company in Hiroshima city
Railway stations in Japan opened in 1910